Dion-Curtis Henry (born 12 September 1997) is an English professional footballer who plays as a goalkeeper for Brighlingsea Regent.

Club career

Peterborough United
Henry signed a two-and-a-half year professional contract at League One club Peterborough United in March 2015, having been associated with the club from the age of 13. He was invited to a senior England goalkeeping training camp at St George's Park in April 2015.

He made his debut in the Football League on 3 October 2015, coming on for Ben Alnwick 30 minutes into a 5–3 victory over Millwall at London Road. After the match manager Graham Westley told the press that "There is cash on the table for Dion from a Premier League club. There has been interest in him from more than one Premier League club and he has been training elsewhere this week."

On 24 March 2016, Henry joined Isthmian League Division One North side Soham Town Rangers on a loan deal for the remainder of the 2015–16 campaign. Two days later, Henry made his debut in a 3–0 away defeat against Harlow Town. Henry went on to make five more appearances before returning to Peterborough at the end of the season.

On 31 August 2016, Henry joined National League North side Boston United on a youth loan until 1 January 2017. Four days later, Henry made his debut in a 3–2 defeat against FC United of Manchester.

Crystal Palace
Henry signed for Crystal Palace on 4 August 2017. He was an unused substitute for the first time against Chelsea on 14 October 2017.

In January 2019, Henry signed for Maidstone United of the National League, on loan until the end of the 2018–19 season.

In January 2020, Henry joined National League South club Hampton and Richmond Borough on loan until the end of the 2019–20 season.

In June 2020, Henry was released by Crystal Palace at the end of his contract.

In October 2020, Henry joined National League South side Billericay Town.

In October 2021, Henry joined Crawley Town on a one-month rolling contract. He joined Brightlingsea Regent in February 2023 having made one EFL Trophy appearance only for Crawley.

Career statistics

References

External links

1997 births
Living people
Sportspeople from Ipswich
English footballers
Association football goalkeepers
Peterborough United F.C. players
Boston United F.C. players
Soham Town Rangers F.C. players
Crystal Palace F.C. players
Maidstone United F.C. players
Hampton & Richmond Borough F.C. players
Billericay Town F.C. players
Crawley Town F.C. players
Brightlingsea Regent F.C. players
Isthmian League players
English Football League players
National League (English football) players